Márta Kelemen (born 17 September 1954) is a retired Hungarian gymnast. She competed at the 1972 and 1976 Summer Olympics in all artistic gymnastics events and finished in third and fourth place in the team competition, respectively. Her best individual result was ninth place in the uneven bars in 1972.

References

1954 births
Living people
Hungarian female artistic gymnasts
Gymnasts at the 1972 Summer Olympics
Gymnasts at the 1976 Summer Olympics
Olympic gymnasts of Hungary
Olympic bronze medalists for Hungary
Olympic medalists in gymnastics
Medalists at the 1972 Summer Olympics
Gymnasts from Budapest
20th-century Hungarian women
21st-century Hungarian women